The Spring Campaign, named also the Glorious Spring Campaign is the military campaign of the Hungarian Revolutionary Army against the forces of the Habsburg Empire in Middle and Western Hungary during the Hungarian Revolution of 1848 between 2 April and 21 May 1849, which resulted in the liberation of almost the whole territory of Hungary from the Habsburg forces.

The spring campaign's commander-in-chief was General Artúr Görgey, whose army (47 500 men, 198 cannons) defeated the numerically, technologically and tactically superior (55 000 soldiers and 214 cannons and rockets) imperial armies led by Alfred I, Prince of Windisch-Grätz and after his dismissal, Ludwig von Welden, in a series of victories. The Hungarians won the battles of Hatvan (2nd of April), Tápióbicske (4th of April), Isaszeg (6th of April), Vác (10th of April), Nagysalló (19th of April), on 26 April relieved the fortress of Komárom from a long Austrian siege, then on 21 May 1849 liberated the Castle of Buda, concluding the Spring Campaign. 

On the other theaters of operations, the Hungarians also scored victories against the enemies of the revolution. 

In Transylvania, the Hungarian army led by Józef Bem, after the victory against the Austro-Russian forces in the Battle of Nagyszeben from 11 March, liberated most of the provinces territory (excepting the fortresses of Gyulafehérvár, Déva, with imperial garrison and the Erdélyi-középhegység mountains, held by the Romanian insurgents). 

In southern Hungary the Hungarians led by Mór Perczel and Józef Bem defeated the Serbian insurgents and Austrian troops, liberating the provinces of Bácska and Bánság, except the fortress of Temesvár and Titel. 

In southern Transdanubia, the popular uprising led by Gáspár Noszlopy also led to the liberation of this region from imperial occupation. 

During the Spring Campaign, the Hungarians liberated much of their country from Habsburg rule. The Habsburg armies and their allies, besides the fortresses and mountains mentioned above, remained only in the Westernmost territory strip of Hungary, Croatia and the fortress of Arad. Also the result of the victories of the Spring Campaign was the Hungarian Declaration of Independence on 14th of April 1849, resulting in total Hungarian independence for some months before the Russian intervention brought the defeat of the Hungarian revolution and war of independence in the Summer Campaign.

External links
  Video animation showing the Spring Campaign's main military operations on the map

References

Military_of_Hungary
Military_campaigns
Hungarian Revolution of 1848